Pol Appeltans (30 March 1922 – 30 June 2001) was a Belgian footballer. He played in one match for the Belgium national football team in 1948.

References

External links
 

1922 births
2001 deaths
Belgian footballers
Belgium international footballers
Association football forwards
Sint-Truidense V.V. players